Thomas Logan is a fictional character appearing in American comic books published by Marvel Comics. The character has been depicted as the biological father of X-Men member Wolverine. He was created by Bill Jemas, Joe Quesada, and Paul Jenkins.  He was featured in the limited series Origin, which detailed the youth and formative years of Wolverine and was published from November 2001 to July 2002.

Fictional character biography
Thomas Logan lives in Alberta, Canada during the late 19th century and is the groundskeeper for the Howlett estate. Logan is a very short tempered man and is known to be a heavy drinker. He is the father of Dog Logan, but his exact date of birth is unknown.  His surname, Logan, implies that Thomas has Scottish ancestry.  

Thomas is abusive towards Dog, often beating him severely and introduces the boy to alcohol. Logan has a violent temper, a mean disposition, flies into uncontrollable rage, and is envious of the Howletts and their great fortune.

After being fired from his position and kicked off the estate for failing to control his son, Thomas returns to the house in the middle of the night, armed, and with his son Dog. He sneaks into the bedroom John and Elizabeth Howlett share and tries to persuade her to leave with him. It is here that a secret affair between the two is implied. Before Elizabeth can reply, John returns to the bedroom and is confronted by Logan. After a heated exchange, Logan shoots and kills John. He is, in turn, killed by James Howlett when the youth drives his bone claws into Thomas' chest. James' mutation is triggered by the trauma of seeing his father killed before his eyes.

The series hints that he and Elizabeth Howlett have been involved in a secret, romantic relationship for years. It is thus implied that Thomas is Wolverine's biological father, with the adult James Howlett looking exactly like him.

Paternity
Even though Thomas Logan bears a striking resemblance to Wolverine as an adult, it is not stated in the mini-series that he's Wolverine's father, though an affair between Logan and James' mother Elizabeth is implied. However, since the mini-series, there have been several one shot issues of the 'Official Handbook of the Marvel Universe released since 2004 that each contain a profile on Wolverine. Within those issues, John Howlett, Jr. is listed as Wolverine's father rather than Thomas Logan.  

Elizabeth was having an affair with Thomas for many years, after she was released from isolation and after the birth of James Howlett. When young James Howlett first uses his claws and kills Thomas, a horrified Elizabeth exclaims "not again, not you James...", subtly referring to the scars on her back that she received from her first son, John Howlett III, who died a mysterious death, which are shown when Rose walks in on Elizabeth. Later on in the mini-series, it is subtly hinted that Grandfather John Howlett Sr. (the I) killed the young John Howlett (the III) after attacking Elizabeth, when John Howlett, Jr. (the II), could not defend his wife. This also alludes that Thomas Logan may have fathered John Howlett III, as-well-as his younger brother, James Howlett (Wolverine), too.  

In Wolverine: Weapon X #8, Logan muses about having killed his own father, believing Tom Logan's paternity.

In Wolverine (vol. 4) #4 (December 2010), it is confirmed by Wolverine himself, during the "Wolverine Goes To Hell" storyline, when he is thinking to himself while fighting the Devil (i.e. Marduk Kurios) in Hell, that Thomas Logan is indeed his biological father. This is further confirmed when they finally have a face-to-face confrontation, in order (in Thomas Logan's own words) "To finally talk, man-to-man, father-to-son". 

In Wolverine #304 (April 2012, the series having returned to its original numbering by having the current volume integrated with previous volumes), he is shown in Hell (which he states is ultimately "Where all Logans go when they die") with the souls of five of his recently deceased grandchildren, the "Mongrels", Wolverine's illegitimate offspring unknowingly fathered with various women over the course of his long life, who Wolverine had been tricked by his enemies into fighting to the death during the Red Right Hand storyline.

In other media
Thomas Logan appears in the beginning of the 2009 movie X-Men Origins: Wolverine'', dying under similar circumstances to his death in the comics (being stabbed by Wolverine's claws after they come out for the first time) and he is confirmed to be Victor Creed's father (in Dog Logan's place) and Wolverine's biological father. He is credited as "Thomas Logan" and played by Aaron Jeffery.

References

Characters created by Andy Kubert
Characters created by Joe Quesada
Characters created by Paul Jenkins (writer)
Comics characters introduced in 2001
Fictional alcohol abusers
Fictional characters from Alberta
Fictional domestic abusers
Fictional horticulturists and gardeners
Fictional janitors
Fictional murderers
Marvel Comics male characters
Superhero film characters
Wolverine (comics) characters
X-Men supporting characters